The Worshipful Company of Stationers and Newspaper Makers (until 1937 the Worshipful Company of Stationers), usually known as the Stationers' Company, is one of the livery companies of the City of London. The Stationers' Company was formed in 1403; it received a royal charter in 1557. It held a monopoly over the publishing industry and was officially responsible for setting and enforcing regulations until the enactment of the Statute of Anne, also known as the Copyright Act of 1710. Once the company received its charter, "the company’s role was to regulate and discipline the industry, define proper conduct and maintain its own corporate privileges."

The company members, including master, wardens, assistants, liverymen, freemen and apprentices are mostly involved with the modern visual and graphic communications industries that have evolved from the company's original trades. These include printing, papermaking, packaging, office products, engineering, advertising, design, photography, film and video production, publishing of books, newspapers and periodicals and digital media. The company's principal purpose nowadays is to provide an independent forum where its members can advance the interests (strategic, educational, training and charitable) of the industries associated with the company.

History
In 1403, the Corporation of London approved the formation of a guild of stationers. At this time, the occupations considered stationers for the purposes of the guild were text writers, limners (illuminators), bookbinders or booksellers who worked at a fixed location (stationarius) beside the walls of St Paul's Cathedral. Booksellers sold manuscript books, or copies thereof produced by their respective firms for retail; they also sold writing materials. Illuminators illustrated and decorated manuscripts.

Printing gradually displaced manuscript production so that, by the time the guild received a royal charter of incorporation on 4 May 1557, it had in effect become a printers' guild. In 1559, it became the 47th in city livery company precedence. At the time, it was based at Peter's College, which it bought from St Paul's Cathedral. During the Tudor and Stuart periods, the Stationers were legally empowered to seize "offending books" that violated the standards of content set down by the Church and state; its officers could bring "offenders" before ecclesiastical authorities, usually the Bishop of London or the Archbishop of Canterbury, depending on the severity of the transgression. Thus the Stationers played an important role in the culture of England as it evolved through the intensely turbulent decades of the Protestant Reformation and toward the English Civil War.

The Stationers' Charter, which codified its monopoly on book production, ensured that once a member had asserted ownership of a text or "copy" by having it approved by the company, no other member was entitled to publish it, that is, no one else had the "right to copy" it. This is the origin of the term "copyright".  However, this original "right to copy" in England was different from the modern conception of copyright. The stationers' "copy right" was a protection granted to the printers of a book; "copyright" introduced with the Statute of Anne, or the Copyright Act of 1710, was a right granted to the author(s) of a book based on statutory law.

Members of the company could, and mostly did, document their ownership of copyright in a work by entering it in the "entry book of copies" or the Stationers' Company Register, though this entry was not a necessity for the holding of a copyright. The Register of the Stationers' Company thus became one of the most essential documentary records in the later study of English Renaissance theatre. (In 1606 the Master of the Revels, who was responsible until this time for licensing plays for performance, acquired some overlapping authority over licensing them for publication as well; but the Stationers' Register remained a crucial and authoritative source of information after that date too.) To be sure, enforcement of the rules was always a challenge, in this area as in other aspects of the Tudor/Stuart regime; and plays and other works were sometimes printed surreptitiously and illegally.

In 1603, the Stationers formed the English Stock, a joint stock publishing company funded by shares held by members of the company. This profitable business gained many patents of which the richest was for almanacks including Old Moore's Almanack. The business employed out-of-work printers and disbursed some of the profit to the poor.

In 1606, the company bought Abergavenny House in Ave Maria Lane and moved out of Peter's College. The new hall burnt down in the Great Fire of 1666 along with books to the value of about £40,000. It was rebuilt and its present interior is much as it was when it reopened in 1673. The Court Room was added in 1748 and in 1800 the external façade was remodelled to its present form.

In 1695, the monopoly power of the Stationers' Company was diminished, and in 1710 Parliament passed the Copyright Act 1709, the first copyright act.

The company established the Stationers' Company's School at Bolt Court, Fleet Street in 1861 for the education of sons of members of the company. In 1894, the school moved to Hornsey in north London. It closed in 1983.

Registration under the Copyright Act 1911 ended in December 1923; the company then established a voluntary register in which copyrights could be recorded to provide printed proof of ownership in case of disputes.

In 1937, a royal charter amalgamated the Stationers' Company and the Newspaper Makers' Company, which had been founded six years earlier (and whose members were predominant in Fleet Street), into the company of the present name.

In March 2012, the company established the Young Stationers to provide a forum for young people (under the age of 40) within the company and the civic City of London more broadly. This led to the establishment of the Young Stationers' Prize in 2014, which recognises outstanding achievements within the company's trades. Prize winners have included novelist Angela Clarke, journalist Katie Glass, and academic Dr Shane Tilton.

The company's motto is Verbum Domini manet in aeternum, Latin for "The Word of the Lord endures forever".

In November 2020 Stationers' Hall the home of the Stationers' Company were finally granted approval to redevelop their Grade 1 listed building to bring modern day conference facilities, air-cooling and step free access to its historic rooms. It reopened in July 2022 for live events, weddings, and filming.

Trades
The modern Stationers' Company represents the "content and communications" industries within the City of London Liveries. This includes the following trades and specialisms:

Archiving (including librarian, curators, and book conservation)
Bookselling and distribution
Communications (including advertising, marketing, and PR)
Digital media and software
Newspapers and broadcasting
Office products and supplies
Packaging
Paper
Print machinery
Printing
Publishing (including digital publishing and design)
Writing (including journalism, broadcasting, and authorship)

Hall

Stationers' Hall is at Ave Maria Lane near Ludgate Hill.  The site of the present hall was formerly the site of Abergavenny House, which was purchased by the Stationers in 1606 for £3,500, but destroyed in the Great Fire of London, 1666. The current building and hall date from circa 1670. The hall was remodelled in 1800 by the architect Robert Mylne and, on 4 January 1950, it was designated a Grade I listed building.

Stationers' Hall hosts the Shine School Media Awards, where students compete in the creation of websites and magazines.

Notable liverymen 
Edward Allde
John Cleave
Thomas Cotes
George Eld
Edmund Evans
George Faulkner
Richard Field
Augustine Matthews
George Mudie (Owenite)
Rupert Murdoch
Thomas Cautley Newby
Nicholas Okes
Peter Short
William Stansby
John Trundle
Sir Christopher Meyer
William Hague

Young Stationers' Prize

The "Young Stationers' Prize" is an annual prize awarded by the Young Stationers' Committee to a young person under 40 years of age who has distinguished themself within the company's trades.  Launched in 2014, the prize is a pewter plate (donated by the Worshipful Company of Pewterers) onto which each winner's name is engraved.

List of Young Stationers' Prize winners 
As of December 2019 there have been seven winners of the Young Stationers' Prize: Katie Glass, journalist, 2014; Angela Clarke, novelist, playwright, and columnist, 2015; Ella Kahn and Bryony Woods, founders of Diamond Kahn & Woods Literary Agency (awarded jointly), 2016; Ian Buckley, managing director of Prima Software, 2017; Shane Tilton, academic and professor of multimedia journalism, 2018; Amy Hutchinson, CEO of the BOSS Federation, 2019.

See also
Authorized King James Version
Eyre & Spottiswoode
Fleet Street
Printing patent

References

Further reading
 
 
 
  
 v.2, 1571–1595
 v.3, 1595–1620
 v.4, 1620–1640
 v.5, index
 
 
  + v.2–3
 
 
 
 
 
 
 
 
 
 
 
 
  in three volumes: 1605–1640, 1641–1700 and 1701–1800. (Charlottesville: Bibliographical Society of the University of Virginia, 1961; Oxford: Oxford Bibliographical Society, 1974 and 1978)
 
 
 
 
 
 
 “Government Control of the Printing Press: Star Chamber Censorship Ordinances (1566, 1586) and Philip Stubbs’ Comments on Censorship (1593).” (2010) Voices of Shakespeare’s England: Contemporary Accounts of Elizabethan Daily Life.
 Blayney, Peter W. M.(2013) The Stationers' Company and the Printers of London: 1501–1557. Vol. 1 Vol. 1. Cambridge: Cambridge Univ. Press.

External links

 The Stationers' and Newspaper Makers' Company
 Events Venue Website

Livery companies
1403 establishments in England
Printing
History of copyright law
17th century in London
Corporatism
Charities based in London
History of the City of London
Organisations based in London with royal patronage